Neuberg (also Neuberk) is a ruins of castle in Podhradí, Cheb District in the Karlovy Vary Region of the Czech Republic.

History 
The castle was built by the Neuberg probably in late 13th century, and was first mentioned in 1288. In that year, after Albrecht von Neuberg's death, King Rudolph I of Bohemia handed Neuberg and the whole village to the lords of Plauen as a fief. Later, the castle was damaged by the army of Charles IV. In 1392, the village and the castle were inherited by Zedtwitz, and became the centre of the whole Aš region.

After a big fire in 1610, the castle was seriously damaged. The House of Zedwitz divided into several lines that moved to new chateaus in Aš, Kopaniny, Doubrava, Smrčina and two chateaus in Podhradí. Since then, the castle has been uninhabited.

The local council tries to save it, but due to lack of finances it is a big problem.

Cheb District
Castles in the Karlovy Vary Region
Ruined castles in the Czech Republic